Eastview is a mostly residential neighbourhood located in south-central Saskatoon, Saskatchewan, Canada. It is a suburban subdivision, consisting of low-density, single detached dwellings, low-rise apartment buildings and semi-detached houses. As of 2007, the area is home to 3,566 residents. The neighbourhood is considered a middle-income area, with an average family income of $58,703, an average dwelling value of $260,050 and a home ownership rate of 51.6%.

History

The most of the land for the Eastview neighbourhood was annexed by the city between 1950 and 1959, with the remaining southern piece annexed between 1960 and 1969. According to a 1913 map of registered subdivisions, Eastview's land was once identified as an acreage and a small, never-developed subdivision called "Megantic Park". Another proposed but undeveloped subdivision called "Preston Place" was in Eastview's southwest corner. Home building began in the area before 1946, but the vast majority of activity occurred between 1961 and 1970. Eastview is unique in that all the streets within it, aside from Arlington Avenue, share the common name of "East". When the streets were named in 1964, the neighbourhood was on the city's eastern edge, giving its residents a true "east view".

Alvin Buckwold School opened in 1966. Another public elementary school, John Dolan School, was opened in 1977. This school was founded in 1955 as a private school to help children with cognitive difficulties. It was first housed in North Park School; by 1967, it was incorporated into the public school system and moved to a facility on Kilburn Avenue. The school moved again in 1977 to the newly built facility in Eastview. In 2005, St. Thomas School absorbed the student population of St. James School in Nutana Park when the latter school closed. The school was renamed Pope John Paul II School.

Government and politics

Eastview exists within the federal electoral district of Saskatoon—Grasswood. It is currently represented by Kevin Waugh of the Conservative Party of Canada, first elected in 2015.

Provincially, Eastview is within the constituency of Saskatoon Eastview. It is currently represented by Corey Tochor of the Saskatchewan Party, first elected in 2011.

In Saskatoon's non-partisan municipal politics, Eastview lies within ward 7. It is currently represented by Councillor Mairin Loewen, who was elected to city council in a 2011 by-election.

Institutions

Education

École Alvin Buckwold School - public elementary school, part of the Saskatoon Public School Division.
John Dolan School - public special education school, part of the Saskatoon Public School Division.
Pope John Paul II School - separate (Catholic) elementary school, part of Greater Saskatoon Catholic Schools.

Public safety
 Saskatoon Fire and Protective Services - east division
 Saskatoon Police Service - east division

Parks and recreation
 A.S. Wright Park - 
 James Anderson Park - 
 Kistakin Park - 

The Eastview Community Association operates indoor and outdoor programs out of Alvin Buckwold, and Pope John Paul II Schools, maintains the community rink and coordinates sports programs for children/youth.

Commercial
Commercial development is limited to the Eastview Shopping Centre, a strip mall on Arlington Avenue. In addition, there are 58 home-based businesses in the neighbourhood. More extensive shopping amenities exist in the neighbouring Nutana Suburban Centre.

Location
Eastview is located within the Nutana Suburban Development Area.  It is bounded by Louise Street to the north, Circle Drive to the south and east, and Preston Avenue to the west.  Roads are a mix of local and collector roads. An interchange at Preston Avenue South and Circle Drive, in the planning since the 1960's was completed in the fall of 2013.

References

External links

Eastview neighbourhood profile
Eastview Community Association

Neighbourhoods in Saskatoon